Trigon Hill is a hill on the edge of a clay pit near Cold Harbour, Dorset, on the Dorset Heaths. It rises about 3 kilometres northwest of the centre of Wareham.

References 

Hills of Dorset